Zhu Xueying (born 2 March 1998) is a Chinese trampoline gymnast and Olympic champion. At the 2017 Trampoline Gymnastics World Championships, she won gold medals in the synchro and team events. At the 2018 Trampoline Gymnastics World Championships, she won silver in the individual event and gold in the team event. In July 2021, she won the gold medal in the women's trampoline event at the 2020 Summer Olympics in Tokyo, Japan.

Career

In 2014, Zhu won the gold medal in the girls' trampoline event at the 2014 Summer Youth Olympics held in Nanjing, China.

In 2017, she won two gold medals at the 2017 Trampoline Gymnastics World Championships held in Sofia, Bulgaria. In 2018, she won the silver medal in the women's individual event at the 2018 Trampoline Gymnastics World Championships held in Saint Petersburg, Russia.

On 30 July 2021, she won the gold medal in the women's trampoline event at the 2020 Summer Olympics in Tokyo, Japan. With a score of 56.635, she became the second Chinese athlete to win the gold in this event.

References

External links 
 

Living people
1998 births
Gymnasts from Beijing
Chinese female trampolinists
Gymnasts at the 2014 Summer Youth Olympics
Medalists at the Trampoline Gymnastics World Championships
Youth Olympic gold medalists for China
Gymnasts at the 2020 Summer Olympics
Olympic gymnasts of China
Medalists at the 2020 Summer Olympics
Olympic gold medalists for China
Olympic medalists in gymnastics
21st-century Chinese women